Peartree Ward is an Electoral Ward in the Unitary Authority of Southampton, England.

It covers the suburbs of Merry Oak, Peartree Green and Itchen, and is bordered (clockwise from south-west) by Bargate Ward, Bevois Ward, Bitterne Park Ward, Harefield Ward, Sholing Ward, and Woolston Ward.

Notable residents include the former Member of Parliament and George Medal recipient Royston Smith.

References

Wards of Southampton